The Havelock Country Jamboree is a four-day country music camping festival held in the village of Havelock, Ontario (located  northeast of Toronto). Called Canada's Largest Country Music and Camping Festival, the festival has a Thursday through Sunday schedule on the third weekend in August every year. The festival has been on-hold due to COVID-19 restrictions since 2020.

History
The Havelock Country Jamboree began in 1990 as a three-day event held on a few acres of farm fields with a semi-truck trailer as the stage. New Twin Stages were built in 2013. The event continues to grow and draw fans from all over North America. 

Havelock Country Jamboree features over 25 entertainers performing on twin stages over a 4-day period.  

The Havelock Jamboree seeks to create a friendly, community atmosphere where music fans can enjoy their favourite performers. The Havelock Country Jamboree features a mix of veteran and young up-and-coming artists from both Canada and the United States. Many of the musicians have appeared in Havelock at past Jamborees. Others, however, are making their first appearance at the now venerable music festival. The twin stages have held over 4000 musicians as the popular festival has grown over the years. The Jamoree has worked hard to create a festive and supportive atmosphere for everyone.

2019 Lineup

Brett Kissel, James Barker Band, The Washboard Union, The Good Brothers, Dead Flowers, Kansas Stone, Doc Yates.

Past performers

A
Trace Adkins
Jason Aldean

B
The Band Perry
Dierks Bentley
Clint Black
Lee Brice
Dean Brody
Kix Brooks
Tracy Byrd

C
Glen Campbell
George Canyon
Carlene Carter
Terri Clark
Stompin' Tom Connors
Creedence Clearwater Revisited
Billy Ray Cyrus

D-I
Joe Diffie
Jessie Farrell
Mickey Gilley
The Good Brothers
Tim Hicks

J
Alan Jackson
Carolyn Dawn Johnson
Wynonna Judd

K
Toby Keith
Kris Kristofferson
 Madison Kozak

L
Dawn Langstroth
Tracy Lawrence
Lonestar
Patty Loveless
Corb Lund
Loretta Lynn

M
Neal McCoy
Scotty McCreery
Country Joe McDonald
Reba McEntire
Jo Dee Messina
Justin Moore
Montana Sky

N-Q
The Neilsons
Juice Newton
Nitty Gritty Dirt Band

R
LeAnn Rimes
Kenny Rogers
Mitch Ryder

S
The Sadies
Earl Scruggs
Crystal Shawanda
Ricky Skaggs
Connie Smith
South Mountain
The Stampeders
Marty Stuart

T-V
Aaron Tippin
Travis Tritt
Tanya Tucker
Ricky Van Shelton

W
Doc Walker
Hank Williams III
Lee Ann Womack

X-Z
Shane Yellowbird
Dwight Yoakam

See also
List of country music festivals
Music in Canada

External links
Havelock Jamboree 

Folk festivals in Canada
Music festivals established in 1990
Country music festivals in Canada
Music festivals in Ontario